Mihrimah Sultan Mosque may refer to:
 Mihrimah Sultan Mosque (Edirnekapı)
 Mihrimah Sultan Mosque (Üsküdar)

Mosque disambiguation pages